Eurycantha is a genus of Australasian stick insects: typical of the tribe Eurycanthini. It was described by Jean Baptiste Boisduval in 1835.

Species
The  Phasmida Species File lists:
 Eurycantha calcarata Lucas, 1869 - Giant Spiny Stick Insect (synonym E. sifia Kirby, 1904)
 Eurycantha coriacea (Redtenbacher, 1908) 
 Eurycantha horrida Boisduval, 1835 
 Eurycantha immunis Redtenbacher, 1908
 Eurycantha insularis Lucas, 1869
 Eurycantha latro Redtenbacher, 1908
 Eurycantha maluensis Günther, 1929
 Eurycantha micracantha (Montrouzier, 1855)
 Eurycantha portentosa Kirby, 1904
 Eurycantha rosenbergii Kaup, 1871

References

External links

Phasmatodea genera
Lonchodidae